Benjamín Rojas Pessi (born April 16, 1985) is an Argentine actor and singer. He was part of the pop-rock band Erreway together with Camila Bordonaba, Felipe Colombo and Luisana Lopilato.

Acting career

Breakthrough (1998–2003)
Rojas was born in La Plata, and began his professional acting career in 1998, when he was 12 years old: he was cast as Yago in Cris Morena's production, Chiquititas. His portrayed a Tarzan–like boy who helped Jimena, played by María Jimena Piccolo, to get out of a jungle. In turn Jimena took him to the Rincón de Luz orphanage. In 1999, for its fifth season, Chiquititas got a complete makeover and renewed its story completely. Rojas continued on the show but playing a new character, Bautista Arce. He reprised the role in Chiquititas feature film Chiquititas: Rincón de Luz.

In 2002, he renewed his contract with the Cris Morena Group and was cast for the role of Pablo Bustamante in the Martín Fierro Award—nominated hit television series Rebelde Way. Along with former Chiquititas fellows Camila Bordonaba, Felipe Colombo and Luisana Lopilato, he formed a music band, named Erreway, which sold more than 10 million compact disc units worldwide. In 2004, Rojas reprised his role of Pablo Bustamante in Erreway: 4 Caminos, a Rebelde Way spin–off film. His films have grossed 8.7 billion in global box office.

Stardom (2004–present)
In 2004, Rojas starred in the El Trece series Floricienta, his third consecutive project with the Cris Morena Group in the span of seven years. He starred the series as Franco Fritzenwalden for two seasons, alongside Florencia Bertotti and Juan Gil Navarro. Rojas also reprised his character in the theatre version of Floricienta. In 2006, he once again worked with Cris Morena on television series Alma Pirata, opposite Luisana Lopilato, Mariano Martínez and Elsa Pinilla. Rojas also recorded several songs for Alma Pirata soundtrack album.

Throughout 2007 and 2009, Rojas had several guest appearances in the television series Casi Ángeles. In 2008, he appeared in two films, Kluge alongside Alejandro Awada, and La leyenda alongside Pablo Rago. These were his first projects done independently from the Cris Morena Group. In 2008, Rojas signed a contract with the Cris Morena Group and the Disney Channel Latin America for a new television sitcom, Jake & Blake, his first project in English. The series, based on the story of The Prince and the Pauper, went on to reach a worldwide success. Rojas signed up for two television series in 2011, Venezuelan series Amigos y Rivales and Argentine series Cuando me sonreís, opposite Facundo Arana and Mariana Espósito.

Musical career
During the development of Rebelde Way, Rojas and his co-stars: Luisana Lopilato, Felipe Colombo and Camila Bordonaba have become the members of the band Erreway. They immediately reached worldwide popularity, especially in Latin America, Spain, Europe and Israel. All their studio albums, Señales (2002), Tiempo (2003) and Memoria, reached Platinum certification. The band was partially inactive from 2005 to 2007, when they reunited as a trio, without Lopilato. They released Erreway presenta su caja recopilatoria, the greatest hits compilation, in 2007, and a new album Vuelvo was announced. However, Vuelvo has never been released. In 2010, Bordonaba and Colombo began their independent musical project, La Miss Tijuana, marking the final split of Erreway.

Rojas has recorded several soundtrack albums for his television series. This includes five Chiquititas soundtrack albums, released from 1998 to 2001. He also had songs in the Floricienta soundtrack album. Rojas also recorded a soundtrack album for Alma Pirata in 2006 and appeared in 2007 soundtrack album of Casi Ángeles. In 2010, Rojas released the soundtrack album for his television series Jake & Blake.

Personal and media life
Rojas was born in La Plata, Argentina, as the youngest of four children of Juan Carlos Rojas and Rosalinda Pessi. He has two brothers, Carlos María and Juan Luis, and a sister, Milagros. Rojas attended the Gimnasia La Plata and played for its rugby team. However, he quit his sports career due to his role in Chiquititas. Rojas is a fan of football soccer and a passionate supporter of Club de Gimnasia y Esgrima La Plata. He is fluent in Spanish and English, which he studied for six months in New York City as the preparation for the television series Jake & Blake, which was shot in English.

From 1998 to 2004, Benjamín Rojas was in a relationship with his co-star the actress, Camila Bordonaba at the time they were both cast for Chiquititas and Rebelde Way.

From 2006 to 2008, Benjamín Rojas was in a relationship with the actress and model, María Del Cerro with whom he was engaged.

Since 2011, Benjamín Rojas has been in a relationship with Martina Sánchez Acosta, a television producer. On December 21, 2018, the couple's first child was born; a girl they named Rita.

Filmography

Television

Theater

Movies

Discography

Soundtrack albums 

 1998  — Chiquititas Vol. 4
 1999 —  Chiquititas Vol. 5
 2000 — Chiquititas Vol. 6
 2001 — Chiquititas Vol. 7
 2001 — Chiquititas: Rincón de Luz
 2004 — Floricienta
 2005 — Floricienta
 2007 — Floricienta
 2006 — Alma Pirata
 2010 — Jake & Blake

Erreway 

 2002 — Señales
 2002 — Erreway en Grand Rex
 2003 — Tiempo
 2003 — Nuestro Tiempo
 2004 — Nuestro Tiempo
 2004 — Memoria
 2004 — Gira 2004
 2006 — El Disco de Rebelde Way
 2006 — Erreway en Concierto
 2007 — Erreway presenta su caja recopilatoria
 2007 — Erreway en España
 2007 — Vuelvo

Roco 
 2013 — Pasarán años
 2013 — Como baila la novia
 2013 — Gira
 2013 — Quien se ha tomado todo el vino
 2013 — Tornado

Singles 
 2017 — Polarizado

Awards and nominations 

2022
|Estrella de Mar Awards
|Supporting Actor
|Una semana nada mas
|
|-
|}

Notes

References

External links
 
 
 

1985 births
Argentine male film actors
21st-century Argentine male singers
Argentine male models
Argentine pop singers
Argentine male stage actors
Argentine male telenovela actors
Argentine male television actors
Argentine people of Spanish descent
Argentine people of Italian descent
Living people
People from La Plata
20th-century Argentine male actors
21st-century Argentine male actors